Rob Doyle (born 13 September 1982) is an Irish author. He has published two novels, a collection of short stories and a book of nonfiction, and he is the editor of two anthologies. His 2014 novel Here Are the Young Men was adapted into a 2020 film of the same name. His writing has appeared in the New York Times, Observer, Dublin Review, and many other publications.

Early life

Doyle was born in Dublin, where his father and mother worked in the post office until their retirement. He studied Philosophy and Psychoanalytic Studies at Trinity College Dublin. After completing his education, Doyle left Ireland to travel and live abroad for a number of years, with periods in Southeast Asia, South America, London, San Francisco and Sicily. Throughout his twenties he made a living as an English language teacher and philosophy tutor. After quitting his teaching work to devote himself full-time to writing, he lived for periods in Paris, Berlin, Dublin, and Rosslare Harbour, County Wexford.

Career

Doyle wrote his first novel, Here Are the Young Men, while living in London. It was published in 2014 by Lilliput Press and Bloomsbury. It was shortlisted for the Newcomer of the Year at the Irish Book Awards, and was included in Hot Press magazine’s ‘20 Greatest Irish Novels 1916-2016’. A film adaptation directed by Eoin Macken and starring Dean-Charles Chapman, Anya Taylor-Joy, Finn Cole and Ferdia Walsh-Peelo was released in 2020. This Is the Ritual, a collection of short fiction, was published in 2016 by Bloomsbury and Lilliput Press, and was a book of the year in the New Statesman and Sunday Times.  Threshold, a work which contains elements of memoir, fiction, and travel-writing, was published by Bloomsbury in 2020. It was described in the TLS as ‘Riddling, irreverent, fearless… His best book so far’, by the New York Times as ‘game and gleefully provocative’, and by Ryan Chapman in Inside Hook as ‘the great drug novel of our time’. Threshold was shortlisted for the Kerry Group Irish Novel of the Year 2021. In 2021 Doyle’s first nonfiction book Autobibliography was published by Swift Press. The book evolved from a weekly column Doyle wrote in the Irish Times throughout 2019 on rereading 52 of the books that had influenced him.
Doyle edited the anthologies The Other Irish Tradition, published in 2017 by Dalkey Archive Press, and In This Skull Hotel Where I Never Sleep, published in 2018 by Broken Dimanche Press.
Doyle played the lead role - ‘the Hitcher’ - in the feature film Hit the North, directed by Daniel Sayer.

Books

• — (2014). Here Are the Young Men. Bloomsbury / Lilliput Press.

• — (2016). This Is the Ritual. Bloomsbury / Lilliput Press.

• — (2020). Threshold. Bloomsbury.

• — (2021). Autobibliography. Swift Press.

References 

1982 births
Living people
21st-century Irish short story writers
Alumni of Trinity College Dublin
Writers from Dublin (city)
21st-century Irish male writers
21st-century Irish novelists
Irish male non-fiction writers
21st-century Irish non-fiction writers
Irish male short story writers